Happy Hollow Farm is a historic house at 2099 Aqua Crossing in Fayetteville, Arkansas.  It is a large single-story log house, shaped in an H, with a broad flared hip roof.  The logs are stacked and held in place with spikes, rather than being notched at the corners.  The property also includes a small log milk house and a stone cottage, all contemporaneous to the house's 1909-10 construction.  The house was built by writer William Rheen Lighton, who made a reputation writing for major periodicals including the Saturday Evening Post, and published several novels and non-fiction books, including one named Happy Hollow Farm that romanticized life on an Arkansas farm.

The house was listed on the National Register of Historic Places in 1986.

See also
National Register of Historic Places listings in Washington County, Arkansas

References

Houses on the National Register of Historic Places in Arkansas
Houses completed in 1909
Houses in Fayetteville, Arkansas
National Register of Historic Places in Fayetteville, Arkansas